Abgrallaspis cyanophylli, the cyanophyllum scale, is one of nine species of the Abgrallaspis genus of armored scale insects. It is a pest throughout the Tropical South Pacific, attacking fruits and ornamental plants.

References

Aspidiotini
Hemiptera of Oceania
Insects described in 1869